Protogoniomorpha duprei, the Malagasy mother-of-pearl, is a species of butterfly-footed butterfly endemic to the island state of Madagascar.

Description
With a wingspan nearing 7 centimetres, Protogoniomorpha duprei is a medium sized butterfly.

Threats

Being an inhabitant of forests, this uncommon insect is affected by habitat loss due to logging and land conversion for agriculture. This is the leading cause of its population decline. It is estimated that the population has declined by 20–30% within the last decade.

References 

Nymphalidae
Insects of Madagascar
Butterflies described in 1863